Puakena Boreham (born 18 December 1970) is a medical practitioner (anaesthetist) who became a Tuvaluan politician, when she was elected to represent Nui in the 2015 Tuvaluan general election. She was appointed as the Minister of Works and Natural Resources in August 2016; and served as the minister during the Sopoaga Ministry. She was re-elected in the 2019 general election.

Dr Boreham is the third woman to be elected to the Parliament of Tuvalu: following Naama Maheu Latasi (1989 to 1997); and Pelenike Isaia (2011 to 2015).

Dr Boreham studied at the Fiji School of Medicine and graduated in 1998. She has worked for the Tuvaluan Ministry of Health at the Princess Margaret Hospital as an anaesthetist and as the Medical Superintendent. In 2014 she carried out post-graduate study at the Australian National University in global health diplomacy, global health and foreign policy.

References

Members of the Parliament of Tuvalu
Tuvaluan women in politics
People from Nui (atoll)
Tuvaluan women
Living people
1970 births
21st-century women politicians